Charmont-sous-Barbuise is a commune in the Aube department, north central France.

Château de Charmont-sous-Barbuise
The château of Charmont-sous-Barbuise was originally a fortified manor house, mentioned in 1233. In 1539 it was described as "the motte of the Coulaverdey manor, which once had a castle, surrounded by a trench, is presently fallen into ruin". It was rebuilt in 1550, and the last château was constructed by Joseph-Aimé Hennequin in 1725. The site was registered as a Monument historique in 1988.

See also
Communes of the Aube department

References

Communes of Aube
Aube communes articles needing translation from French Wikipedia